The  Sri Lankan Ambassador to Brazil is the Sri Lankan envoy to Brazil. The Sri Lankan Ambassador to Brazil is concurrently accredited as Ambassador to Argentina, Chile, Colombia, Peru and Suriname. The current ambassador is General Jagath Jayasuriya.

Former ambassadors
 Mahinda Balasuriya
 Hamilton Shirley Amerasinghe
 Rohan Daluwatte
 Shantha Kottegoda

See also
List of heads of missions from Sri Lanka

References

Sri Lanka
Brazil